Parolise is a village and comune of the province of Avellino in the Campania region of southern Italy.

Geography
Parolise lies in the upper Irpinia area of the Apennine Mountains. The towns of Candida, Chiusano di San Domenico, Lapio, Montefalcione, Salza Irpina and San Potito Ultra are nearby.

Economy
Parolise is known for the Calzaturificio Scorta,  that provided shoes for the nobility of Southern Italy, and boots for the Italian Army during World War II.

Notes and references

 
 	

Cities and towns in Campania